Pardo River or Rio Pardo may refer to:

Brazil
 Pardo River (Amazonas), a river of Amazonas state in north-western Brazil
 Pardo River (Bahia), a river of Bahia state in eastern Brazil
 Pardo River (Das Velhas River), a river of Minas Gerais state in southeastern Brazil
 Pardo River (Mato Grosso do Sul), a river of Mato Grosso do Sul state in southwestern Brazil
 Pardo River (Paranapanema River), tributary of the Paranapanema in southern São Paulo state
 Pardo River (Ribeira River), tributary of the Ribeira River in southern São Paulo and northeastern Paraná
 Pardo River (Rio Grande), tributary of the Rio Grande in northern São Paulo and southwestern Minas Gerais
 Pardo River (Rio Grande do Sul), a river of Rio Grande do Sul state in southern Brazil
 Pardo River (São Francisco River), a river of Minas Gerais state in southeastern Brazil
 Pardo River (Xingu), a river in the state of Pará, Brazil

See also
 Pardo (disambiguation)